Yakuninskaya is a rural locality (a village) in Nizhneslobodskoye Rural Settlement, Vozhegodsky District, Vologda Oblast, Russia. The population was 29 as of 2002.

Geography 
Yakuninskaya is located 46 km east of Vozhega (the district's administrative centre) by road. Derevenka is the nearest rural locality.

References 

Rural localities in Vozhegodsky District